Bostancı may refer to:

 Bostancı, a neighbourhood of Kadıköy district in Istanbul, Turkey
 Bostancı, Gönen, a village
 Bostancı, İspir
 Bostançı, a village and municipality in the Khachmaz Rayon of Azerbaijan
 Bostanji, one of the imperial guards of the Ottoman Empire